is a commercial broadcasting station headquartered in Kyoto, Japan.

Its radio station serves Kyoto and Shiga Prefectures and is a member of  National Radio Network (NRN). Its television station serves Kyoto Prefecture and is a member of the Japanese Association of Independent Television Stations (JAITS). Since April 1, 2005, KBS is broadcasting digital television in ISDB format.

Broadcasting

AM Radio
KBS Kyoto Radio (京都放送ラジオ)
Kyoto - 1143 kHz, 50 kW, JOBR
Maizuru - 1215 kHz, 2 kW, JOBO
Fukuchiyama - 1485 kHz, 100 W, JOBE
KBS Shiga (Hikone) - 1215 kHz, 1 kW, JOBW, some prefectural programming.

FM Radio
94.9 MHz 3 kW

TV (Analogue)
JOBR-TV - KBS Kyoto Television (京都放送テレビジョン)
Kyoto - Channel 34, 10 kW
Uji-Momoyama - Channel 57
Maizuru - Channel 57, 100 W
Fukuchiyama - Channel 56, 200 W
Miyazu - Channel 39, 100 W
Yamashina - Channel 62, 10 W
Wazuka - Channel 40, 10 W
Yawata - Channel 43, 3 W
Kameoka - Channel 41, 300 W

and more

TV (Digital)
JOBR-DTV - KBS Kyoto Digital Television (京都放送デジタルテレビジョン)
Remote Controller ID 5
Kyoto - Channel 23

History
Main source:
1968: Starts television test transmission from Mount Hiei.
1969: Starts television broadcasting service. Networking with Tokyo 12 channel (now TV Tokyo) and Nippon Educational Television (now TV Asahi.) (Currently KBS is not a member of eithers' network.)
1981: Began doing business as "KBS Kyoto".
 It was involved with the Itoman fraud case for a certain period of time in 1990s which risked the company to bankruptcy.
1999: The corporation reorganization procedure begins.
1 April 2005: Starts digital television broadcasting.
2007: The corporation reorganization procedure is complete.
2008: Well known toy brand Tomy releases a Kyoto Broadcasting System Choro-Q toy van edition

Program

TV

, etc...

Radio
, etc...
All Night Nippon (produced by Nippon Broadcasting System, Inc. (LF))
All Night Nippon (Mon. - Sat. from 25:00 until 27:00)
All Night Nippon Ever Green (Mon. - Thu. from 27:00 until 29:00)
All Night Nippon R (Fri. and Sat. from 27:00 until 29:00)
Fukuyama Masaharu All Night Nippon Saturday Special Tamashii no Radio (Sat. from 23:30 until 25:00)

Note: All times are in Japan Standard Time (UTC+9) in this article. The broadcast time can exceed 23:59, this refers to the morning hours of the following day (meaning Mon 27:00 - 29:00 equals Tue 03:00 - 05:00.)

See also

 UHF (Independent UHF Station)
 List of radio stations in Japan

References

External links
 

Independent television stations in Japan
Radio in Japan
Television stations in Japan
Companies based in Kyoto
Radio stations established in 1951
Television channels and stations established in 1969
Japanese companies established in 1951
Mass media in Kyoto